Sikh rites: The Sikhs engage in various regular activities to concentrate the mind on God and undertake selfless service. These rites and services are:

Ardas: The Ardās is normally said while standing with folded hands before and after performing any relevant task. It starts with "pritham bhagautee simar kai, Gur Nanak laee dhiaa-e " and ends with "Naanak naam charhdee kalaa, tayray bhaanay sarbat da bhala."  It is more than just a prayer; it is a new concept of therapy for the elevation of the human spirit, mind and body. Following are the main features and benefits of saying the ardās.

Dasvand: is the giving of one tenth of one's income (10%) to the Guru's cause. It is a practice of recognizing that every thing comes from God, the benevolent Giver and this demonstrates the Sikh's faith and devotion to the Guru. The dasvand is like a seed. The Sikhs believe that this is a seed of trust that actually has the effect of multiplying your income just as a seed sprouts and grows into more plants.

Langar: is the term used in the Sikh religion for the free, vegetarian-only food served in a Gurdwara and eaten by everyone sitting as equals. The practice was introduced by Guru Nanak Dev Ji to break the caste system that was prevalent in India during the 13th and 14th centuries.

Paath: is the recitation of Gurbani. It may be done individually or in a group; it can be the recitation of one's Banis (one coherent section) or any part of the Siri Guru Granth Sahib, alone or with others listening or reciting along. The person reciting Gurbani should pronounce every syllable correctly so that the Naad, the sound current may be produced and affect the consciousness of the one reciting and the one listening.

Kara Parshad: is a sweet flour based oily vegetarian food which is offered to all visitors to the Darbar Sahib in a Gurdwara. This is regarded as food blessed by the Guru and should not be refused. As it has a very high sugar and oil content, if these ingredients are not suitable for you, ask the Sewadar to give you a very small amount of “Parshad”.

Kirtan: is one of the pillars of Sikhism and in that context refers to the singing of the sacred hymns from the Guru Granth Sahib to set music normally in classical Ragas format. The Sikhs place huge value on this type of singing and a Sikh is duty bound to listen and/or sing Guru-Kirtan as frequently as possible.

Sikh practices